Angareh is a village in Shesh Pir Rural District, Hamaijan District, Sepidan County, Fars Province, Iran. At the 2006 census, its population was 86, in 19 families.

References 

Populated places in Sepidan County